The 2022 Sugar Bowl was a college football bowl game played on December 31, 2022, at Caesars Superdome in New Orleans, Louisiana. The 89th annual Sugar Bowl, the game featured Kansas State from the Big 12 Conference and Alabama from the Southeastern Conference (SEC). The game began at 11:00 a.m. CST and was aired on ESPN. It was one of the 2022–23 bowl games concluding the 2022 FBS football season. Sponsored by insurance company Allstate, the game was officially known as the Allstate Sugar Bowl.

Due to National Football League (NFL) scheduling considerations, New Year's Day bowl games are rescheduled when January 1 falls on a Sunday. As the NFL's 18-week regular season resulted  in Monday Night Football (which Sugar Bowl rightsholder ESPN is committed to broadcast) being played in Week 17 on January 2, the Sugar Bowl was moved to December 31 for the first time since its 1995 edition.

Teams
Consistent with conference tie-ins, the game featured Alabama from the Southeastern Conference (SEC) and Big 12 Conference champion Kansas State. In the final College Football Playoff (CFP) rankings, they were ranked fifth and ninth, respectively. This was the first meeting between the two programs.

Alabama

Alabama entered the season as one of the favorites to win both the SEC and the national championship, however, after getting off to a 6–0 start, they fell to Tennessee on a last-second field goal and were defeated by LSU in overtime. The later loss cost Alabama the SEC West title. The Crimson Tide finished their regular season with a 10–2 record, 6–2 in SEC play.

As SEC champion, Georgia finished with the number-one seed in the final CFP rankings, and thus advanced to the national semifinals, Alabama was selected for the Sugar Bowl as the next-highest ranked SEC team. This was Alabama's 17th Sugar Bowl appearance, having a record of 9–7 in prior appearances.

Kansas State

Kansas State began the season unranked, but after compiling a 7–2 conference record, they qualified for the Big 12 Championship Game, where they upset TCU, 31–28 in overtime. Kansas State had lost to TCU during the regular season, along with losses to Tulane and Texas. They defeated two ranked teams, Oklahoma and Oklahoma State. As a result of winning a Power Five championship, the Wildcats earned an automatic bid to a New Years Six game. The Wildcats were invited to the Sugar Bowl, which, since the 2015 season, normally invites the Big 12 champion, notwithstanding CFP semifinal scheduling. This was Kansas State's first appearance in the Sugar Bowl. They enter the bowl with an overall 10–3 record.

Game summary

Statistics

See also
 2022 New Orleans Bowl, contested at the same venue on December 21

References

Sugar Bowl
Sugar Bowl
Sugar Bowl
Sugar Bowl
Alabama Crimson Tide football bowl games
Kansas State Wildcats football bowl games